The Karesuando Church is a wooden church building in Karesuando, Sweden. Belonging to the Karesuando Parish of the Church of Sweden. It was inaugurated on 3 December 1905 by Bishop Olof Bergqvist of the Diocese of Luleå., replacing an older church. The church is the northernmost in Sweden.

References

External links

20th-century Church of Sweden church buildings
Churches in Norrbotten County
Churches completed in 1905
Wooden churches in Sweden
Churches in the Diocese of Luleå
1905 establishments in Sweden